The Fast Express is a 1924 American drama film serial directed by and starring William Duncan. The film is considered to be lost, though a "fragmentary print" exists.

Cast

Chapter titles

Facing the Crisis
Vanishing Diamonds
Woman of Mystery
Haunted House
Perils of the City
Cipher Message
Bandit Raiders
Impostor's Scheme
Falsely Accused
Path of Danger
The Abduction
The Trial Run
The False Summons
Black Treasure
Retribution

See also
 List of American films of 1924
 List of film serials
 List of film serials by studio

References

External links

1924 films
1924 drama films
1924 lost films
American silent serial films
Silent American drama films
American black-and-white films
Universal Pictures film serials
Lost American films
Films with screenplays by George H. Plympton
Films directed by William Duncan
1920s American films